Daniel Ellis or Dan Ellis may refer to:
Daniel Ellis (botanist) (1772–1841), British physician, aerologist, botanist and author
Daniel Ellis (Unionist) (1827–1908), captain in the Union army during the American Civil War
Daniel David Ellis (1860–1927), physician and politician in Saskatchewan, Canada
Dan Ellis (born 1980), Canadian ice hockey player
Daniel Ellis (footballer) (born 1988), English footballer
Dan Ellis (cyclist) (born 1988), Australian sprint cyclist
Dan Ellis (entrepreneur) BEM (born 1989), Founder of Jam Jar Cinema and Arts Investor